This is a list of topics related to Brunei.

Brunei media
 Media of Brunei
 Borneo Bulletin
 The Brunei Times
 Media Permata
 Radio Television Brunei

Brunei royalty 
Pengiran Anak Saleha
 Prince Jefri Bolkiah
 Al-Muhtadee Billah
 Pengiran Anak Sarah

Sultans of Brunei
 List of Sultans of Brunei
 Abdul Momin
 Hassanal Bolkiah
 Hashim Jalilul Alam Aqamaddin
 Muhammad Jamalul Alam II
 Omar Ali Saifuddin I
 Omar Ali Saifuddin II
 Omar Ali Saifuddin III
 Ahmad Tajuddin

Buildings and structures in Brunei
Ministry of Finance Building, Brunei

Airports in Brunei
 Brunei International Airport

Football venues in Brunei Darussalam
 Sultan Hassanal Bolkiah Stadium

Houses in Brunei

Palaces in Brunei
 Istana Nurul Iman
 Istana Darul Hana
 Istana Pékan
 Istana Darussalam
 Istana Mahkota

Royal residences in Brunei
 Istana Nurul Iman

Hotels in Brunei
 Abdul Razak Hotel Apartments
 Centrepoint Hotel, The
 Empire Hotel and Country Club, The
 Rizqun International Hotel, The
 Radisson Brunei Hotel
 The Holiday Lodge Hotel
 Kiulap Plaza Hotel
 Palm Garden Hotel
 Parkview Hotel (formerly known as LR Asma Hotel)
 Terrace Hotel
 Roomz Hotel, Seria
 The Swiss Hotel Apartment, Kuala Belait
 Plaza Sutera Biru, Kuala Belait
 Traders Inn Hotel
 V Hotel, Kuala Belait
 Sea View Hotel, Kuala Belait
 Riviera Hotel, Kuala Belait
 Times Hotel
 Orchid Garden Hotel
 D'Anggerek Service Apartments
 Hotel Sentosa, Kuala Belait
 Ulu Ulu Resort, Temburong
 The Capital Residence Suites

Parks in Brunei
List of parks in Brunei Darussalam

Cities in Brunei
 List of cities in Brunei
 Bandar Seri Begawan
 Bangar
 Kuala Belait
 Seria
 Tutong

Bruneian culture
 Culture of Brunei

Bruneian music
 Music of Brunei

Sport in Brunei
 Brunei Darussalam at the 2006 Commonwealth Games

Football in Brunei

 Brunei national football team
 Football Association of Brunei Darussalam

Golf in Brunei

Golf tournaments in Brunei
 Brunei Open

Brunei at the Olympics
 Brunei at the 1988 Summer Olympics
 Brunei at the 1996 Summer Olympics
 Brunei at the 2000 Summer Olympics
 Brunei at the 2004 Summer Olympics
 Brunei at the 2008 Summer Olympics
 Brunei at the 2012 Summer Olympics
 Brunei at the 2016 Summer Olympics
 Brunei at the 2020 Summer Olympics

Economy of Brunei
 Economy of Brunei
 Brunei dollar

Companies of Brunei

Ethnic groups in Brunei
 Kedayan
 Malays (ethnic group)
 Dusun
 Tutong
 Belait
 Bisaya
Murut

Fauna of Brunei

 Banteng
 Bengal monitor
 Black bittern
 Black-crowned night heron
 Black-headed ibis
 Blood python
 Bulwer's pheasant
 Burmese python
 Cattle egret
 Chinese egret
 Chinese pond heron
 Cinnamon bittern
 Crested wood partridge
 Glossy ibis
 Great argus
 Great cormorant
 Great crested grebe
 Great egret
 Grey heron
 Indian pond heron
 Intermediate egret
 Jambu fruit dove
 Little cormorant
 Little egret
 Little grebe
 Oriental darter
 Cantor's giant softshell turtle
 Proboscis monkey
 Purple heron
 Reticulated python
 Saltwater crocodile
 Sarus crane
 Striated heron
 Tiger
 Wagler's pit viper
 Water monitor
 Wreathed hornbill
 Yellow bittern

Geography of Brunei
 Geography of Brunei
 Anduki

Bays of Brunei
 Brunei Bay

Islands of Brunei
 Borneo
 Greater Sunda Islands
 Sunda Islands

Spratly Islands
 Spratly Islands
 Fiat Island
 James Shoal
 Kalayaan, Palawan
 Kingdom of Humanity
 Loaita Island
 Republic of Morac-Songhrati-Meads
 Sin Cowe Island
 Thitu Island

Maps of the Spratly Islands
 Maps of the Spratly Islands

Maps of Brunei
 Maps of Brunei

Rivers of Brunei
 Brunei River

Government of Brunei

 Yang di-Pertuan Negara

Official residences in Brunei
 Istana Nurul Iman

History of Brunei
 History of Brunei
 A. M. Azahari
 Borneo campaign (1945)
 Brooketon
 Brunei Revolt
 Indonesia-Malaysia confrontation
 Shannon Marketic
 North Borneo Federation
 Sultanate of Sulu
 White Rajahs

Elections in Brunei
 Politics of Brunei

Languages of Brunei

 Languages of Brunei
 Brunei English

Malay culture

 Adat
 Alfuros
 Bangsawan
 Bawang Putih Bawang Merah
 Bendahara
 Bomoh
 Cape Malays
 Dangdut
 Dondang Sayang
 Malay ghost myths
 Hang Jebat
 Hang Nadim
 Hang Tuah
 Hari Raya
 Hari Raya Aidilfitri
 History of Dikir Barat
 Jenglot
 Kertok
 Laksamana
 Legend of Gunung Ledang
 Makam Mahsuri
 Malay Ruler
 Malay houses
 Malay titles
 Malay world
 Malaysian name
 Manananggal
 Nasi lemak
 Orang Bunian
 Orang Minyak
 Pantun
 Pontianak (folklore)
 Ronggeng
 Satay
 Sepak Takraw
 Sosatie
 Taming Sari
 Temenggung
 Toyol
 Wayang

Military of Brunei
 Royal Brunei Armed Forces
 Royal Brunei Navy

Monarchy in Brunei

Politics of Brunei

 Politics of Brunei
 Legislative Council of Brunei
 Melayu Islam Beraja

Political parties in Brunei
 Brunei National Solidarity Party
 Brunei People's Awareness Party
 Brunei People's Party
 Politics of Brunei

Schools in Brunei
 List of schools in Brunei
 Jerudong International School
 Paduka Seri Begawan Sultan Science College
 St. George's School, Brunei
 Sekolah Menengah Awang Semaun
 Sekolah Menengah Sayyidina Ali
 St. Andrew's School, Brunei
 Sultan Omar Ali Saifuddien College 
 Duli Pengiran Muda Al-Muhtadee Billah College

Subdivisions of Brunei
 Subdivisions of Brunei

Districts of Brunei
 Districts of Brunei
 Belait District
 Brunei-Muara District
 Temburong District
 Tutong District

Health
 Health in Brunei

Transport and travel in Brunei

 Visa requirements for Bruneian citizens
 Transport in Brunei
 Royal Brunei Airlines destinations

Airlines of Brunei
 Royal Brunei

Non-Government Organisation (NGO) 

 Astronomical Society of Negara Brunei Darussalam (PABD)
 BruCert
 Persekutuan Pengakap Negara Brunei Darussalam

See also
Brunei's very own star and exoplanet: Gumala & Mastika
LGBT rights in Brunei (Gay rights)
Lists of country-related topics - similar lists for other countries

References